Aidan Rocha (born December 25, 2000) is an American soccer player who plays as a midfielder for the USL Championship club Loudoun United FC.

Career

Youth
Rocha attended St. John's College High School. Rocha also played club soccer with Bethesda Soccer Club up until 2019, where he was a four-year starter serving as a captain his junior and senior years.

College 
In 2019, Rocha attended Georgetown University to play college soccer. In four seasons with the Hoyas, Rocha made 69 appearances, scoring five goals and tallying six assists. During his time at college, Rocha was named the Big East Midfielder of the Year and named First Team All-Big East.

Professional
In December 2022, Rocha entered the 2023 MLS SuperDraft as one of the 367 eligible players. On December 21, 2023, Rocha was drafted 60th overall by D.C. United Rocha signed with USL Championship club Loudoun United on March 10, 2023. He made his professional debut the following day, starting in a 3–1 away victory over Memphis 901.

References

2000 births
Living people
American soccer players
Association football midfielders
D.C. United draft picks
Georgetown Hoyas men's soccer players
Loudoun United FC players
People from Brookeville, Maryland
Soccer players from Maryland
USL Championship players